Mariya Yefremova (born 19 October 1998) is a Kazakhstani athlete who specializes in Triple jump. She represented Kazakhstan at the 2022 World Athletics Championships, competing in Triple jump.

References

External links
 

1998 births
Living people
Kazakhstani female triple jumpers
Place of birth missing (living people)
World Athletics Championships athletes for Kazakhstan
20th-century Kazakhstani women
21st-century Kazakhstani women